José Vicente de Freitas, 2nd Baron of Freitas GCTE (22 January 1869 – 6 September 1952) was a Portuguese military officer and politician.

De Freitas was born in Calheta, Madeira. He fought in Flanders during Portuguese participation in World War I, and was awarded the Grand-Cross of the Order of the Tower and Sword, the highest Portuguese decoration.

He was a colonel when the 28 May 1926 movement took place. He supported the Ditadura Nacional and was Instruction Minister from 1927 to 1929. He served as 98th Prime Minister (President of the Council of Ministers), from 18 April 1928 until 8 July 1929, shortly after being promoted to general.  He died in Lisbon with the rank of General.

Family 
He was son of José Joaquim de Freitas and Sophia Amélia de Freitas, who had seven children. Vicente de Freitas was brother to:

 Jorge Joaquim de Freitas (1870-1941)
 Manuel dos Passos Freitas ( 1872- 1952) -  Lawyer and Musician
 Francisco João de Freitas (1874 -?)
 João Nepomuceno de Freitas (1877-1953) - Colonel and doctor. As his brother he joined CEP in the battle of La Lys. He was later appointed Grand-Nurse in 1927, during the tenancy of Óscar Carmona's Government, while his brother was Minister of Interior.
 José Maria de Freitas (1879-1958)
 Júlio de Freitas (1881-1882)
 Maria José de Freitas Fernandes ( 1885-1952)

Military and Academic Career 
After his studies in Madeira - in Calheta and Funchal - he left for the mainland to start a military career, where he volunteered for the Hunter Regiment No. 12 (1887), as 1st Corporal, then as 1st Corporal Junior Officer (1889), being promoted to Second Lieutenant (1891), Lieutenant (1886), Captain (1904), Major (1913), Lieutenant Colonel (1917), Colonel (1919) and having reached General (1928).

In his military capacity coordinated cartography works, including the Lisbon Plan with all the improvements made and projected in the city (circa 1910), a map of outstanding technical and artistic quality.

During his military career, he played an important role, having been part of the Portuguese Expeditionary Corps in France during World War I (1917–18).

He has also devoted himself to teaching, either as author of drawing textbooks for secondary education or as a course organizer for the Army Corporal and Sergeant School. He was professor of the National School since 1895, an institution of which he was director after 1917.

After his political career, he rejoined the military career, ending it as director of the Military Academy(1935–1939).

Political career 
As a military man, he did not intend to get involved in politics, but events and his prestige determined that he should, for the positions he eventually held in the political context.

Thus, in a country in political turmoil, since the events leading up to the coup of 5 October 1910 then as captain, he supported King Manuel II.

His most active participation in political life began in 1915 - when General Pimenta de Castro was President of the Republic and Manuel de Arriaga was head of government - he was invited to the position of Civil Governor of Funchal between February and May 1915. He would later be elected as a deputy by the Funchal circle through the Governmental Party.

His greatest involvement in national political life starts on May 28, 1926 with a march led by General Gomes da Costa from Braga to Lisbon, to restore normalcy and order, following the instability and governing crisis of the First Republic. This march would then give rise to the II Republic, that would become in 1933 known as Estado Novo.

Prime-Minister of Portugal 
In 1928, General Óscar Carmona, is elected President and appoints Vicente de Freitas to form government, as President of the Council of Ministers (Prime-Minister), to which he agrees. Due to the financial crisis that stroke the country and in an attempt to different parties the country he appoints as Minister of Finance, the then Coimbra Professor, António Oliveira Salazar.

In February 1928, Vicente de Freitas visited Fátima, as a sign of validation of his political power and his commitment to the apparitions/visions.

Following the Ordinance of the Bells - an ordinance that authorized the use of bells by churches, without limitations, but that an edict by the Governor of Évora created hourly limitations for this - which generated controversy and divisions in government among the unconditional supporters of the Church (among which Oliveira Salazar) and Vicente de Freitas, the later would file resignation.

Mayor of Lisbon 
Between 1926 and 1933 he was appointed Mayor of the Lisbon City Council Administrative Commission.

Following his resignation as Prime-Minister he expresses his dissenting position on a conservative, nationalist constitutional revision project and the rise of the National Union as a single party, contrary to the objectives of its creation. In his sharp critics, published in the media, he concluded that "If States have to be strong, then freedom of thought cannot cease to exist.", this would motivate Oliveira Salazar to dismiss him from the capital, on 15 February 1933, his term would nevertheless end on paper on 31 December 1934, thus ceasing its political career.

Honours

National Honours
 Commander of the Order of Aviz, (15 February 1919)
 Grad-Cross of the Order of the Tower and Sword, (25 August 1928)
 Grand-Cross of the Order of Aviz, (24 June 1932)

Foreign Honours
 Grand-Cross of the Order of the Crown of Italy, Italy (4 August 1930)
 Grand Officer of the National Order of Merit of Carlos Manuel de Céspedes (24 June 1932)

References

1869 births
1952 deaths
Madeiran politicians
20th-century Portuguese politicians
Portuguese generals
Prime Ministers of Portugal
Finance ministers of Portugal
Mayors of Lisbon
People from Madeira
Portuguese military personnel of World War I
Recipients of the Order of the Tower and Sword
Commanders of the Order of Aviz
Grand Crosses of the Order of Aviz